Parker Industries (also known as Parker Tech) was a former fictional multibillion-dollar conglomerate appearing in American comic books published by Marvel Comics. Created by Dan Slott, Christos Gage, and Humberto Ramos, the corporation first appeared in The Superior Spider-Man #20 (October 2013).

Publication history
The conglomerate first appeared in The Superior Spider-Man #20 (October 2013), created by Dan Slott, Christos Gage, and Humberto Ramos, and ended during Secret Empire.

Fictional history
After being fired from Horizon Labs, Otto Octavius (who at the time was inhabiting Peter Parker's body) decided to create his own company: Parker Industries. Parker Industries first replaced Aunt May's hip so that she now walks without a limp. With the help of Dr. Elias Wirtham, Otto made artificial legs for Flash Thompson to replace the ones he lost when he was fighting in the Iraq War. Sajani Jaffrey and Wraith were able to use an antidote to the Goblin Formula to regress Monster back to Carlie Cooper.

In the aftermath of the fight against the Goblin Nation, Peter himself took up the reins to manage the company and publicly announced that he was no longer "working with Spider-Man".

Peter soon announced that the company would be putting its cybernetics project on hold in order to focus on the capture, curing and depowering of Electro, and to develop a new super-villain prison.

While searching to get energy readings from Electro's last known location Peter and some employees arrived at the spot which was on fire. After Peter as Spider-Man saved everyone inside with the help of fireman Ollie Olivera, Black Cat stole one of their devices, found Electro with it, and persuaded him to help her get Spider-Man. J. Jonah Jameson's father J. Jonah Jameson, Sr. became the biggest investor to Parker Industries. Parker Industries was successful in curing Electro after successfully trapping him.

When he was released from prison, Clayton Cole briefly was in the services of Doctor Minerva during her fight with Spider-Man. When Kamala Khan was seen carrying an Inhuman baby that she has rescued from Doctor Minerva, Clayton turned against Doctor Minerva and helped Kamala Khan. Upon being recognized by Spider-Man, Clayton was offered a job at Parker Industries, which he accepted.

Parker Industries competed against Alchemax to determine who will get the contract for the new super-villain prison. Alchemax members Mark Raxton and Tiberius Stone hired Ghost to sabotage Parker Industries. After Spider-Man's fight with Ghost, the Parker Industries building collapses.

As part of the All-New, All-Different Marvel branding, it is shown that Parker Industries has gained some new employees, established Parker Tower in Shanghai, China, a branch of its company in London, Horizon University in San Francisco, and the Uncle Ben Foundation. Peter has re-established Spider-Man's ties to the company, presenting Spider-Man as their 'symbol' in the same manner as Iron Man's official relationship to Stark Industries. Parker Industries' Webware product becomes a target of the Zodiac's Pisces Sect.

Parker Industries later set up its temporary headquarters in the renovated Baxter Building where Clayton Cole and Molly are working, which caused Human Torch to retaliate. After the fight between Spider-Man and Human Torch has ended, Spider-Man told Human Torch that the Baxter Building is the temporary headquarters even after having to outbid Alchemax, Hammer Industries, and Roxxon Energy Corporation. He also stated that he will return the ownership to the Fantastic Four when they are back together. Human Torch is glad that it is with family. During this time, it is revealed that Harry Osborn is also working for Parker Industries' New York office while using his mother's maiden name of Lyman.

Parker Industries worker Lian Tang is secretly in league with Scorpio where she provided him with security codes in exchange for medicine to give to her mother who was sick with cancer. When Scorpio threatened to have her disposed of as a loose end, she offered to kill Spider-Man for him in exchange for the medication for her mother.

It has since been revealed that the Zodiac have actually completely infiltrated Parker Industries, using its resources and funding to support their own agenda as one of their members is a CEO of one of the company's branches. However, Spider-Man refuses to back down, proclaiming his vow of great power and great responsibility to confirm that he will destroy his own company to defeat Zodiac if that is what it will take.

Peter Parker later plans to have Parker Industries get familiar with New U Enterprises' "New U" system, a program where replacement organs are cloned for those suffering from serious injuries.

Mega Tony, a part-time alchemist who had been working with various mercenaries like those from the M.O.D.O.K. Organization, was having trouble finding work. After a brief stay in Arcade's Dungeon Murderworld, Gwenpool came up with a better idea than him trying to tag along on dangerous missions. A short time later, on her suggestion, he took his tech to Parker Industries and showed it to Peter Parker himself, who was very impressed with the revolutionary concepts. Tony says it's just stuff he uses to fight battles and Parker begins to reminisce about when he was a teenager and used to come up with impossible inventions on the fly, barely stopping before telling Tony why he would have been doing that. Tony is immediately hired and goes to tell Gwen how good his interview went. All she asks in return is that he one day introduces her to Peter Parker, leaving Tony very impressed with how much she must love science.

During the Secret Empire storyline, Otto Octavius, in the form of Superior Octopus, approached Peter Parker in order to get him to pass ownership of Parker Industries back to him. When Peter Parker refused the offer, Superior Octopus had the Hydra agents blow up the London branch of Parker Industries. As Peter flees to the Hong Kong branch of Parker Industries, Octavius attempts to implement various security protocols he had added to all Parker Industries tech, that allows him to retake control of anything developed by the company. But Peter turns the tables on Octavius by ordering his employees to literally destroy the company in order to hurt Hydra, thwarting Octavius's attempt to shut down his new high-tech suit with an EMP by reverting to his traditional costume and turning the EMP trick against Octavius, so that his own tentacles attack him. Octavius is forced to flee the battle. Peter's decision to destroy the company yielded mixed reactions, though some of his employees and Aunt May applauded Peter for refusing to give into Hydra.

During the Beyond arc, after helping to bring Peter Parker out of a coma that the U-Foes put him in, Doctor Octopus attacks the satellite location of Beyond Corporation's shell corporation Infinite Solutions and finds that they were taking assets from the defunct Parker Industries, their use of Ben Reilly's incarnation of Spider-Man, and the copying of Doctor Octopus' Spider-Man technology. This causes Doctor Octopus to declare vengeance on the Beyond Corporation.

Staff members

Current
 Peter Parker  - The founder and formerly CEO of Parker Industries.
 May Parker - Peter Parker's aunt & benefactor.
 J. Jonah Jameson Sr. - Peter Parker's step-cousin & benefactor.
 Anna Maria Marconi - A graduate of Empire State University who became a researcher at Parker Industries.
 Dr. Elias Wirthman - A physician who is associated with Parker Industries.
 Dr. Yao Wu - The head of Parker Industries' bio-tech division.
 Harry Lyman - The head of Parker Industries' New York office.
 Molly - Employee at the Baxter Building with Clayton Cole.
 Hobie Brown - Head of Security. He poses as Spider-Man when Peter Parker has to be seen at public events.
 Lian Tang - A designer at the Shanghai branch of Parker Industries. She co-designed the latest Spider-Mobile with Peter Parker. Lian is secretly a spy working for Scorpio.
 Living Brain - A robot that Superior Spider-Man (Doctor Octopus' mind in Peter Parker's body) confiscated from the Sinister Six and modified to be his assistant. After regaining his body, Peter Parker kept Living Brain as his assistant. Now Living Brain contains a copy of the consciousness of Doctor Octopus.
 Miguel O'Hara - Head of Research and Development for the New York Office.
 Min Wei - Peter Parker's personal secretary.
 Phillip Chang - He was in charge of Parker Industries' renewable energy research.
 Roberta Mendez - A time-displaced Captain America from the 2099 variation of Earth-23291.
 Mega Tony - A recently hired alchemist and former mercenary who, on his friend Gwenpool's suggestion, blew Peter Parker away with his revolutionary technology.

Former
 "Peter Parker" (Otto Octavius) - The former founder and CEO of Parker Industries; died when he erased his mind so that Peter Parker's consciousness could take over his body once again.
 Clayton Cole - A former criminal named Clash who joins Parker Industries as a scientist at its New York Branch.
 Sajani Jaffrey - A former Horizon Lab worker and the Head of Research and Development at Parker Industries' European Branch. Sajani was known for creating the artificial metal Reverbium (a form of Vibranium). She was fired when Doctor Octopus' conscious framed her by using her nanotech to hack into London's CCTV system.
 Vernon Jacobs - A former investor who turned out to be Scorpio and was responsible for the Zodiac sects that attacked Parker Industries.

Reception

Accolades 

 In 2018, Sideshow ranked Parker Industries 8th in their "Top 10 Superhero Corporations" list.
 In 2019, CBR.com ranked Parker Industries 3rd in their "Top 10 Fictional Marvel Companies" list and 7th in their "10 Most Iconic Superhero Hideouts In Marvel Comics" list.

In other media

Television 

 Parker Industries appears in the Ultimate Spider-Man episode "Nightmare on Christmas." In Spider-Man's dreams, Nightmare in the form of Spider-Man's bad conscious shows Spider-Man what the world would be like if Peter Parker stopped being Spider-Man. It showed that Peter Parker later started Parker Industries at the same time when Green Goblin in his new identity of Goblin King took over the world and killed every superhero that faced him.

See also
 Cross Technological Enterprises
 Oscorp

References

External links
 Parker Industries at Marvel Wiki
 Parker Industries at Comic Vine

Spider-Man